Tales of Terror is a 1962 horror film

Tales of Terror may also refer to:

 Tales of Terror (band), an American hardcore punk band
 Tales of Terror (Tales of Terror album), 1984
 Tales of Terror, a 1985 publication of Eclipse Comics